P. P. Naolekar is the Lokayukta of Madhya Pradesh. He was also a Judge of the Supreme Court of India.

Career
Madhya Pradesh High Court as Permanent Judge  1992. 
Rajasthan High Court Judge 1994. 
Appointed the Chief Justice of the Gauhati High Court 2002. 
Elevated as Judge of the Supreme Court of India 2004 to 2008.

External links
 Lokayukta of Madhya Pradesh

References

1943 births
Living people
Ombudsmen in India
20th-century Indian judges
21st-century Indian judges
Justices of the Supreme Court of India